Liptena minziro is a butterfly in the family Lycaenidae. It is found in the Kakamega Forest in Kenya and at Minziro Forest in Tanzania.

References

Butterflies described in 2008
Liptena